Healing Camp, Aren't You Happy, or simply known as Healing Camp, is a South Korean talk show which began airing on July 18, 2011, on SBS. It is hosted by comedian Lee Kyung-kyu, broadcaster Kim Je-dong, and actress Sung Yu-ri. The program is known to have created a new genre of talk shows focused on "healing", which have become the trend of talk shows in 2012 and 2013.

Healing Camp is also known for its superior casting capabilities, inviting top actors and actresses, as well as politicians, athletes, and other influential people who are not easily seen on entertainment programs.

In June 2013, it was announced that Han Hye-jin would leave the program following her marriage to footballer Ki Sung-yueng in July and would move to London with him.

Hosts 
 Kim Je-dong (July 18, 2011 – February 1, 2016)
 Han Hye-jin (July 18, 2011 – August 12, 2013)
 Lee Kyung-kyu (July 18, 2011 –July 20, 2015)
 Sung Yu-ri (August 19, 2013 – July 20, 2015)
 Seo Jang-hoon (October 12, 2015 – February 1, 2016)
 Hwang Kwang-hee (October 12, 2015 – February 1, 2016)

List of episodes

2011

2012

2013

2014

2015

2016

Ratings 
In the ratings below, the highest rating for the show will in be red, and the lowest rating for the show will be in blue each year.

2011

2012

2013

2014

2015

2016

Awards and nominations

Notes

References

External links 
 Healing Camp, Aren't You Happy official website on SBS 

Seoul Broadcasting System original programming
South Korean television talk shows
2011 South Korean television series debuts
2016 South Korean television series endings
South Korean variety television shows
Korean-language television shows